Jgheaburi may refer to several villages in Romania:

 Jgheaburi, a village in Corbi Commune, Argeș County
 Jgheaburi, a village in Reghiu Commune, Vrancea County